This is a list of the towns, cities and municipalities in Thuringia in Germany.
The German federal state of Thuringia consists of a total of 
 631 politically independent cities, towns and municipalities (as of 1 July 2021).

These are divided as follows:
 117 towns and cities, of which
 5 are independent towns or cities (kreisfreie Städte) (including the state capital of Erfurt),
 1 is a "large district town" (Große Kreisstadt),
 5 are "large district-associated towns" (Große kreisangehörige Städte),
 80 are independent towns (they discharge all municipal functions themselves – 23 towns of which are "fulfilling municipalities" (erfüllende Gemeinden),
 24 are special towns, which are part of municipal associations (Verwaltungsgemeinschaften),
 514 other municipalities, of which
 58 are independent municipalities (they discharge all municipal functions themselves – 16 of which are fulfilling municipalities),
 456 are other municipalities.

387 towns and municipalities have merged their municipal authorities into 43 municipal associations. See: Municipal associations in Thuringia.

A feature of the Thuringian administration are the "fulfilling municipalities" (erfüllende Gemeinden). 39 towns and villages that do not belong to a municipal association are fulfilling municipalities for another 95 municipalities.

30 municipalities are referred to as "rural municipalities" (Landgemeinden); they can be towns at the same time.

Independent towns and cities (Kreisfreie Städte)

Large county towns

Towns and municipalities 
All politically independent towns and municipalities in Thuringia (towns are shown in bold):

A

B

C

D

E

F

G

H

I

J

K

L

M

N

O

P

Q

R

S

T

U

V

W

Z

See also 
 List of towns in Thuringia
 Municipal associations in Thuringia

 
 
 
Thuringia
Thur
Tow